Yalankoz can refer to:

 Yalankoz, Bağlar
 Yalankoz, Tut